Three regiments of the British Army have been numbered the 83rd Regiment of Foot:

83rd Regiment of Foot (1757), raised in 1757, disbanded 1763, opposed the 1762 Spanish invasion of Portugal
83rd Regiment of Foot (Royal Glasgow Volunteers), raised in 1777, disbanded 1783
83rd (County of Dublin) Regiment of Foot, raised in 1793, amalgamated with the 86th (Royal County Down) Regiment of Foot to form the Royal Irish Rifles in 1881